Correia is a settlement in the Água Grande District on São Tomé Island in São Tomé and Príncipe. Its population is 575 (2012 census). Located 3 km west of the city centre of São Tomé, it forms a part of the São Tomé Urban area. Before ca. 2010, it was part of the Lobata District.

Population history

Sports
The football (soccer) club of the village is UD Correia.

References

Populated places in Água Grande District